Gustav Grahn (born 1 January 2004) is a speedway rider from Sweden.

Speedway career 
Grahn became the Swedish Under 21 champion in 2021. He represented Sweden at senior level in the 2022 Speedway of Nations 2 final. Also in 2022 he finished 13th in the final standings of the 2022 SGP2.

In 2022, he rode for Indianerna in Sweden.

Family
His older brother Jonatan Grahn is also a professional speedway rider.

References 

Living people
2004 births
Swedish speedway riders